Abdülkadir Sünger (born 24 May 2000) is a Turkish professional footballer who plays as a goalkeeper for Denizlispor.

Professional career
Sünger is a youth product of Sarayköy 1926, and moved to the academy of Denizlispor in 2016. He signed his first professional contract in 2020. Sünger made his professional debut with Denizlispor in a 3–2 Süper Lig loss to Alanyaspor on 12 April 2021.

References

External links
 
 

2000 births
Living people
Sportspeople from Denizli
Turkish footballers
Denizlispor footballers
Süper Lig players
Association football goalkeepers